Marta Pösová (born 4 April 1965) is a Slovak handball player. She competed in the women's tournament at the 1988 Summer Olympics.

References

1965 births
Living people
Slovak female handball players
Olympic handball players of Czechoslovakia
Handball players at the 1988 Summer Olympics
Sportspeople from Bojnice